Sassocorvaro Auditore is a comune (municipality) in the Province of Pesaro and Urbino in the Italian region of Marche. It was established on 1 January 2019 with the merger of the municipalities of Sassocorvaro and Auditore.

Sassocorvaro borders the following municipalities: Gemmano, Lunano, Macerata Feltria, Mercatino Conca, Monte Cerignone, Montefiore Conca , Piandimeleto, Tavoleto, Urbino.

References

Cities and towns in the Marche